Roger Lawson (born September 28, 1949) is a former American football running back. He played for the Chicago Bears from 1972 to 1973.

References

1949 births
Living people
American football running backs
Western Michigan Broncos football players
Chicago Bears players